Charles Moore (23 December 1771 – 14 December 1826) was an English politician. He served in the House of Commons of Great Britain from 1799 to 1802 as Member of Parliament for Woodstock. He was later the member for Heytesbury in the enlarged House of Commons of the United Kingdom from 1802 to 1806 and again from 1807 to 1812.

References

External links
 

Members of the Parliament of Great Britain for English constituencies
Members of the Parliament of the United Kingdom for English constituencies
UK MPs 1801–1802
UK MPs 1802–1806
UK MPs 1806–1807
UK MPs 1807–1812
1771 births
1826 deaths
British MPs 1796–1800